Heteropsis masoura is a butterfly in the family Nymphalidae. It is found on Madagascar.

References

Elymniini
Butterflies described in 1875
Endemic fauna of Madagascar
Butterflies of Africa
Taxa named by William Chapman Hewitson